Thomas McPherson or Tom McPherson  may refer to:
People

Politicians
Tom McPherson (born 1935), American politician; mayor of Cooper City, Florida
Thomas McPherson, Mayor of Melbourne Australia 1870-1871; see List of mayors and lord mayors of Melbourne

Others
Thomas McPherson, alias used by the founder of the James Kirk diploma mills
Thomas Shanks McPherson, philanthropist and namesake for the McPherson Playhouse
Tom McPherson, Welsh rugby player with Ebbw Vale RFC
Tommy McPherson II, director of the Mobile Museum of Art
Fiction
Tommy McPherson, character in Alien Abduction: Incident in Lake County

See also
Thomas McPherson Brown
Thomas Macpherson (disambiguation)